The Central District of Kangan County is in Bushehr province, Iran. At the 2006 census, its population was 40,793 in 8,663 households. The following census in 2011 counted 105,190 people in 15,325 households. At the latest census in 2016, the district had 107,801 inhabitants living in 27,873 households.

References 

Districts of Bushehr Province
Populated places in Kangan County